Bactriola is a genus of longhorn beetles of the subfamily Lamiinae, containing the following species:

 Bactriola achira Galileo & Martins, 2008
 Bactriola antennata Galileo & Martins, 2008
 Bactriola circumdata Martins & Galileo, 1992
 Bactriola falsa Martins & Galileo, 1992
 Bactriola maculata Martins & Galileo, 1992
 Bactriola minuscula Fontes & Martins, 1977
 Bactriola paupercula Bates, 1885
 Bactriola vittulata Bates, 1885

References

Forsteriini